Alexandriysky is the name of the following places

, a county-level subdivision of the Russian Empire